The 2018 America East women's basketball tournament began on February 28 and conclude with the championship game on March 9. Maine, the winner of the America East earns an automatic bid to the 2018 NCAA tournament.

Seeds
Teams are seeded by record within the conference, with a tiebreaker system to seed teams with identical conference records.

Schedule
All tournament games are nationally televised on an ESPN network:

Bracket and Results

All times listed are Eastern

External links
 2018 America East Women's Basketball Championship

See also
 2018 America East men's basketball tournament

References

Tournament
America East Conference women's basketball tournament
Events in Portland, Maine
College sports tournaments in Maine
Sports in Portland, Maine
College basketball in Maine
2018 in sports in Maine
21st century in Portland, Maine